The 2008 FIA Alternative Energies Cup was a season of the FIA Alternative Energies Cup, a world championship for vehicles with alternative energy propulsion organized by the Fédération Internationale de l'Automobile. The season consisted of seven rallies, beginning on 30 March, and ended on 12 October.
Italy's Giuliano Mazzoni (Opel Corsa) won his second Drivers championship, and Toyota secured their second Manufacturers' title.

Driver Standings

References

FIA E-Rally Regularity Cup seasons
Fia Alternative Energies Cup